Pembroke, Nova Scotia may refer to:
Pembroke, West Hants
Pembroke, Yarmouth County